Mario Relmy (born May 7, 1960) is a former professional footballer who played as a striker.

External links
Mario Relmy profile at chamoisfc79.fr

1960 births
Living people
Guadeloupean footballers
French footballers
Association football forwards
FC Girondins de Bordeaux players
Stade Rennais F.C. players
Chamois Niortais F.C. players
FC Metz players
Dijon FCO players
La Tamponnaise players
Ligue 1 players
Ligue 2 players
Dijon FCO managers